Gabriela Goldsmith (born Ruth Gabriela Goldschmied Guasch on September 11, 1963, in Mexico City, Mexico) is a Mexican actress, former beauty queen, teacher and doctor in innovation and social responsibility and president of two civil society organizations.

Life

Goldsmith was born September 11, 1963, in Mexico City, Mexico, into a Jewish family, with German ancestry. Her mother was Cuban descent and her father was Mexican descent.

She began her artistic career by winning a modeling contest in the year of 1982, was able to make her way into the competitive world of entertainment. Within the theatrical stages, Goldsmith, participated in Mujeres frente al espejo, work with which she won the Dramatic Theater Revelation Prize awarded by the Group of Theater Critics and Journalists, in addition to acting in Engáñame si quieres.

While in the field of cinematography the actress has to his credit more than 50 films, among which are La mujer del tahúr (1985), El hijo de Pedro Navaja (1985), Gavilán o paloma (1985), Federal de Narcóticos (1991) and  Reclusorio (1997).

In 1996, Gabriela Goldsmith graduated as a dental surgeon from the Autonomous University of Mexico and years later she became a teacher in social responsibility by the Universidad Anáhuac. She is currently a doctor candidate for innovation and social responsibility since she is in the research process.

Filmography

Films

(1985) Terror y encajes negros - Neighbor
(1985) Narco terror
(1985) La mujer del tahúr 
(1985) Gavilán o paloma*(1986) El hijo de Pedro Navaja - Snadra
(1986) Yako, cazador de malditos
(1986) Un macho en la cárcel de mujeres
(1986) Lavadores de dinero 
(1987) Policía salvaje 
(1988) Su destino era matar 
(1988) Pandilla de cadeneros 
(1988) Los hermanos machorros 
(1988) El virus del poder
(1988) Ladrón
(1988) Taquito de ojo
(1988) Muertes anunciadas - Maru
(1989) Si mi cama hablará
(1989) Las calenturas de Juan Camaney II
(1989) El vampiro teporocho - Roxana
(1989) Si mi cama hablara
(1990) Lo inesperado
(1990) Jack el vigilante
(1990) Dios se lo pague
(1990) La mujer del tahúr
(1990) Las travesuras de Super Chido - Luisa Lana
(1990) La vengadora implacable - Sofía
(1990) Los Pelotones y Juan Camaney
(1990) Inesperada venganza
(1991) Federal de narcóticos (División Cobra)
(1992) Más allá del deseo
(1992) Ramiro Sierra
(1992) El gato con gatas - Ángela
(1993) Al filo de la muerte - López
(1994) Una luz en la escalera - Georgina
(1995) Sobredosis de violencia
(1996) Metiche y encajoso III
(1996) Del robo al paraíso
(1996) Trebol negro
(1996) Lluvia de diamantes - Leonor
(1997) No le bailes de caballito - Silvia
(1997) Metiche y encajoso IV
(1997) La camioneta azul de la mafia
(1997) El poder del narco
(1997) El ejecutor - Adriana Farres
(1997) Capos de almoloya
(1997) Ataque contra las pandillas
(1997) Reclusorio - Olga
(1997) Cacería de judiciales
(1999) Fiesta privada
(2003) Venganza de un terrorista
(2004) Animales en peligro
(2005) Matador

Television

Awards & nominations

References

External links 
 
 Gabriela Goldsmith 
 Gabriela Goldsmith en Alma Latina

1963 births
Living people
Mexican telenovela actresses
Mexican television actresses
Mexican film actresses
Mexican stage actresses
Mexican beauty pageant winners
Actresses from Mexico City
Mexican people of Jewish descent
Mexican people of German descent
Mexican people of Cuban descent
20th-century Mexican actresses
21st-century Mexican actresses
People from Mexico City